Grayling ( in Holikachuk language) is a city in Yukon-Koyukuk Census Area, Alaska, United States. At the 2010 census the population was 194, unchanged from 2000. Since 1977, the Athabaskan village has seen a surge of interest on odd-numbered years, when it is the site of a checkpoint during the Iditarod Trail Sled Dog Race. It is situated after the checkpoint at Anvik and before Eagle Island.

Geography
Grayling is located at  (62.910472, -160.067250).

Demographics

Grayling first appeared on the 1970 U.S. Census as a city. It incorporated in 1969.

As of the census of 2000, there were 194 people, 51 households, and 37 families residing in the city.  The population density was 17.7 people per square mile (6.9/km2).  There were 63 housing units at an average density of 5.8 per square mile (2.2/km2).  The racial makeup of the city was 7.22% White, 88.14% Native American, 0.52% from other races, and 4.12% from two or more races.  1.03% of the population were Hispanic or Latino of any race.

Of the 51 households, 47.1% had children under the age of 18 living with them, 43.1% were married couples living together, 19.6% had a female householder with no husband present, and 25.5% were non-families. 21.6% of all households were made up of individuals, and 5.9% had someone living alone who was 65 years of age or older.  The average household size was 3.80 and the average family size was 4.39.

In the city, the age distribution of the population shows 46.4% under the age of 18, 6.2% from 18 to 24, 22.7% from 25 to 44, 18.6% from 45 to 64, and 6.2% who were 65 years of age or older.  The median age was 20 years. For every 100 females, there were 100.0 males.  For every 100 females age 18 and over, there were 116.7 males.

The median income for a household in the city was $21,875, and the median income for a family was $18,750. Males had a median income of $21,250 versus $21,250 for females. The per capita income for the city was $7,049.  About 62.1% of families and 64.5% of the population were below the poverty line, including 82.9% of those under the age of eighteen and none of those 65 or over.

Education
The Iditarod Area School District operates the David Louis Memorial School in Grayling.

References

Cities in Alaska
Cities in Yukon–Koyukuk Census Area, Alaska
Yukon River